Christos Archontidis (26 June 1938 – 22 October 2019) was a Greek football manager.

He managed Korinthos, Greece, Doxa Drama, PAS Giannina, Iraklis, Diagoras, Panachaiki, PAOK, Apollon Smyrnis, Panserraikos and Panachaiki.

References

1938 births
2019 deaths
Greek football managers
Greece national football team managers
Iraklis Thessaloniki F.C. managers
PAOK FC managers
PAS Giannina F.C. managers
Panachaiki F.C. managers
Apollon Smyrnis F.C. managers
Panserraikos F.C. managers
People from Lefkonas
Sportspeople from Central Macedonia